The Chapel of the Good Shepherd also known as the Episcopal House or the Chapel in the Woods, is an historic Carpenter Gothic house of worship located on Clark Avenue on the grounds of the Chautauqua Institution in Chautauqua, New York, USA. Its dedication on July 2, 1894, was reported in The New York Times the next day.

The Chapel of the Good Shepherd is a contributing property in the Chautauqua Institution Historic District.

Current use
This Episcopal chapel is open primarily during the summer months when the Chautauqua Institution holds its annual session. During that time the Holy Eucharist is celebrated during weekday mornings and two services are held on Sunday.

The chapel is also used during the summer season by the Chautauqua Roman Catholic Community for weekday Mass while Sunday Masses are held in the Hall of Christ.

References

External links
 Paintings of the chapel by local artist, Thelma Winter, accessed November 10, 2007
 Flickr photo of chapel

Chautauqua Institution
Episcopal church buildings in New York (state)
Carpenter Gothic church buildings in New York (state)
Historic district contributing properties in New York (state)
National Register of Historic Places in Chautauqua County, New York
Churches on the National Register of Historic Places in New York (state)